Race suicide may refer to:

Race suicide, a concept in Eugenics
Race Suicide (1916 film), an American short film directed by George Terwilliger
Race Suicide (1938 film), an American film produced by Willis Kent